Volvarina angustata, common name : the narrow marginella, is a species of sea snail, a marine gastropod mollusk in the family Marginellidae, the margin snails.

Description
The shell size varies between 11 mm and 28 mm

Distribution
This species is distributed in the Indian Ocean along the Mascarene basin, Réunion, and in the Gulf of Bengal along the Andaman Islands, Sri Lanka and Southern India.

References

 Drivas, J. & M. Jay (1988). Coquillages de La Réunion et de l'île Maurice
 Cossignani T. (2006). Marginellidae & Cystiscidae of the World. L'Informatore Piceno. 408pp
 Wakefield A. (2010) A revision of the genus Cryptospira Hinds, 1844 (Caenogastropoda: Marginellidae). Novapex Hors-série 7: 1–55.

External links
 

Marginellidae
Gastropods described in 1846